Hermitage is the twelfth full-length album by Portuguese gothic metal band Moonspell, released on 26 February 2021. This is their first album without original drummer Miguel "Mike" Gaspar. Drums are performed by new member Hugo Ribeiro (not related to singer Fernando Ribeiro).

This album was recorded in Orgone Studios, UK, produced and mixed by Jaime Gomez Arellano, noted for working with Paradise Lost, Primordial, Ghost, and Sólstafir.

Track listing
All songs written by Pedro Paixão and Ricardo Amorim, all lyrics by Fernando Ribeiro (except "Darkness in Paradise" - Leif Edling).

Personnel
Fernando Ribeiro – vocals
Ricardo Amorim – guitars
Aires Pereira – bass
Pedro Paixão – keyboards
Hugo Ribeiro – drums

Production
 Artūrs Bērziņš – cover art
 Ivo Sotirov – engineering
 Jon Phipps – music consultant
 João Diogo – design
 Jaime Gomez Arellano – producer, mixing, mastering
 Paolo Ramos – vocal coaching
 Rui Vasco – photography

Charts

References

2021 albums
Moonspell albums
Napalm Records albums